Matt McKenzie is an actor best known for his voicework in games and movies. He is the voice of Auron in the RPG games Final Fantasy X, Final Fantasy X-2, and Kingdom Hearts II. He also provided the English voice of Borgoff in the movie Vampire Hunter D: Bloodlust, Ptolemy in Reign: The Conqueror, and Major Elliot in the animated movie Final Fantasy: The Spirits Within. McKenzie has also guest starred in some well-known movies (Gods and Monsters with Sir Ian McKellen, in which he portrayed Colin Clive) and TV shows such as Star Trek: Voyager, Star Trek: Deep Space Nine, JAG, 7th Heaven, That '70s Show, The O.C. and recently 24 as Agent Hollister. He also had a cameo role in Clint Eastwood's The Rookie as Inspector Wang. He appeared in an episode of House M.D. as Doctor Fedler, where he talks briefly with Robert Chase about The Beatles. He appeared on two episodes of AMC's Mad Men as Crab Colson. Most notably, he voiced Agent Smith and various Agents in The Animatrix.

McKenzie is often typecast as grumpy or serious due to his somewhat "gruff" voice. He appeared in theater productions performed in the Pacific Resident Theatre, the Old Globe Theatre and the Notre Dame Theatre. Some of his highlight shows have been Anna Christie, Scotland Road, Barbarians, and An Ideal Wife.

Filmography

Films

Television

Video Games

References

External links

20th-century American male actors
21st-century American male actors
American male film actors
American male stage actors
American male television actors
American male video game actors
American male voice actors
Living people
Place of birth missing (living people)
Year of birth missing (living people)